12 Signs of Love is a 2012 South Korean television series starring Yoon Jin-seo and On Joo-wan. It aired on tvN from February 15 to April 5, 2012, on Wednesdays and Thursdays at 23:00 (KST) for 16 episodes.

The romantic comedy series is based on the 2005 German novel Zwölf Männer hat das Jahr by Martina Paura.

Cast 

 Yoon Jin-seo as Na Mi-roo
 On Joo-wan as Cha Jin-oh
 Go Joon-hee as Park Tan-ya 
 Kim Da-hyun as Jo Hyun-woo
 Kim Jin-woo as Won Bin
 Julien Kang as Alex
 Park Sang-myun as Dong-gun
 Kwang Soo as Shi-hoo
 Lee Yong-woo as Lee Joon
 Kim Jung-min as Director Goo
 Choi Hyun-woo as magician
 Sung Je as Kwan-woo
 Park Ji-woo as Kang-soo
 Park Ji-il as Chan-sung
 Choi Su-rin as Michelle Jang
 Bae Geu-rin as Oh Hae-ra
 Yang Geum-seok as Oh Yeon-soon

References

External links
 
 

2012 South Korean television series debuts
2012 South Korean television series endings
Korean-language television shows
TVN (South Korean TV channel) television dramas
South Korean romantic comedy television series
Television shows based on German novels